The Council of Arab Economic Unity (CAEU) was founded by Egypt, Iraq, Jordan, Kuwait, Libya, Mauritania, Palestine, Saudi Arabia, Sudan, Tunisia, Syria, United Arab Emirates and Yemen on May 30, 1964, following an agreement in 1957 by the Economic Council of the Arab League.

Objectives 
According to The Economic Unity Agreement approved on June 3, 1957, the Council of Arab Economic Unity desires to "Organize and consolidate economic relations among the States
of the Arab League on bases that are consistent with the natural and historical links among them; and to provide the best conditions for flourishing their economies, developing their resources and ensuring the prosperity of their countries."
The bases of economic relations between states in the Council of Arab Economic Unity are outlined in Chapter 1, Articles 1 and 2 of The Economic Unity Agreement:

Article 1

Article 1 delineates each member state's rights to:
 Personal and capital mobility
 Free exchange of goods and products
 Exercise of residence and economic endeavors (work, employment, etc.)
 Transit and use of ports and airports
 Possession and inheritance

Article 2

Article 2 behoves the signatories of The Economic Unity Agreement to work towards  the objectives specified in Article 1 by:
 Merging into a unified customs area
 Unifying their import and export policies
 Unifying their regulations with regard to transit
 Jointly negotiating agreements with other states
 Unifying and coordinating legislation to achieve equal conditions of agriculture, industry and trade among member states
 Coordinating legislation with regard to labor and social security
 (a) Coordinating "government and municipal taxes and duties and all taxes pertaining to agriculture, industry, trade, real estate, and capital investments" to achieve equivalent business climates among member states; (b) Avoiding double-taxing nationals of member states
 Coordinating monetary and fiscal policies
 Unifying "statistical methods of classification and tabulations"
 Adopting any other measures consistent with the stated objectives of Articles 1 and 2

Agadir Agreement 

"The Agadir Agreement" for the establishment of a free trade zone between the Arab Mediterranean Nations was signed in Rabat, Morocco on 25 February 2004. The agreement aimed at establishing free trade between Jordan, Tunisia, Egypt and Morocco which was seen as a first potential step in the formation of the Euro-Mediterranean free trade area as envisaged in the Barcelona Process.

The Agreement aims to establish a Free Trade Area among the member states, in addition to increase intra-trade on one hand and with the European Union on the other. It also aims to enhance industrial integration among the Arab Mediterranean countries through the Implementation of the Pan-Euro-Mediterranean rules of origin and the utilization of the principle of cumulation of origin. This will enhance the member states’ export capacity towards the EU market and boost attraction for more foreign and European direct investment.

in 2016, the membership of Palestine and Lebanon was approved at the third meeting of Agadir member ministers.

Greater Arab Free Trade Area 

The "Greater Arab Free Trade Area" (GAFTA) is a pan-Arab free trade zone that came into existence in 1997. It was founded by 14 countries: Bahrain, Egypt, Iraq, Kuwait, Lebanon, Libya, Morocco, Oman, Qatar, Saudi Arabia, Sudan, Syria, Tunisia, and the United Arab Emirates. The formation of GAFTA followed the adoption of the "Agreement to Facilitate and Develop Trade Among Arab Countries" (1981) by the Arab League's Economic and Social Council (ESC) and the approval by seventeen Arab League member-states at a summit in Amman, Jordan of the "Greater Arab Free Trade Area Agreement" (1997). In 2009, Algeria joined GAFTA as the eighteenth member-state. GAFTA is supervised and run by the ESC.
 
The members participate in 96% of the total internal Arab trade, and 95% with the rest of the world by applying the following conditions:

Instruct the inter-customs fees:
To reduce the customs on Arab products by 10% annually, the 14 Arab states reported their custom tariff programs to the Security Council of the Arab League to coordinate them. Syria was excepted and uses the Brussels tariffs system.
Applying the locality of the Arab products:
All members have shared their standards and specifications to help their products move smoothly from one country to another.
The League has also created a project to apply the Arab Agriculture Pact:
Which is to share the standards of the agricultural sector and inject several restrictions and specifications.
The Arab League granted exceptions, which allowed for a customs rate for certain goods to six members for several goods, however requests for additional exceptions were rejected by Morocco, Lebanon and Jordan.
Private sectors:
The League created a database and a service to inform and promote the private sector's benefits.
Communication:
The Economic and Social Council in its sixty-fifth meeting agreed on pointing a base for communication to ease communication between member states, and to work on easing interaction between the private and public sectors to further apply the Greater Arab Free Trade Area.
Customs Duties:
In the sixty-seventh meeting the Economic and Social Council agreed that a 40% decrease on customs on goods in the past 4 years of the GAFTA would continue and following the decisions at the Amman summit, the members will make efforts to eliminate all customs duties on local goods.

See also 
 African Economic Community
 Arab League
 Intergovernmental Authority on Development
 Arab Fund for Economic and Social Development
 Middle East Free Trade Area (disambiguation)
 Arab Monetary Fund
 Arab Maghreb Union
 Euro-Mediterranean free trade area
 Euro-Mediterranean Partnership
 European Neighbourhood Policy
 Third country economic relationships with the European Union
Rules of Origin
Market access
Free-trade area
Tariffs

References

External links
http://www.amf.org.ae/
https://web.archive.org/web/20080506173842/http://www.arableagueonline.org/las/arabic/details_ar.jsp?art_id=124&level_id=110

Arab organizations
Organizations established in 1964
Arab League
Economy of the Arab League
International economic organizations
International organizations based in the Middle East
Trade blocs
Treaties concluded in 1957
Treaties entered into force in 1964
1964 in economics